Mandritsara is a district in northern Madagascar. It is a part of Sofia Region and borders the districts of Befandriana-Nord in north, Maroantsetra in northeast, Mananara in east,  Soanierana Ivongo in southeast, Andilamena in south and Boriziny (Port-Bergé) in west.

Communes
The district is further divided into 22 communes:

 Ambalakirajy
 Ambarikorano
 Ambaripaika
 Ambilombe
 Amboaboa
 Ambodiadabo
 Ambohisoa
 Amborondolo
 Ampatakamaroreny
 Andohajango
 Anjiabe
 Ankiabe Salohy
 Antanambaon'amberina
 Antananadava
 Antsatramidoladola
 Antsirabe Afovoany
 Antsoha
 Kalandy
 Manampaneva
 Mandritsara
 Marotandrano
 Tsaratanana

Nature
 Marotandrano Reserve is at 42 km from Mandritsara.
 Part of Makira Natural Park

References and notes

Districts of Sofia Region